Carbaryl (1-naphthyl methylcarbamate) is a chemical in the carbamate family used chiefly as an insecticide. It is a white crystalline solid previously sold under the brand name Sevin, which was a trademark of the Bayer Company. The Sevin trademark has since been acquired by GardenTech, which has eliminated carbaryl from most Sevin formulations. Union Carbide discovered carbaryl and introduced it commercially in 1958. Bayer purchased Aventis CropScience in 2002, a company that included Union Carbide pesticide operations. Carbaryl was the third-most-used insecticide in the United States for home gardens, commercial agriculture, and forestry and rangeland protection. As a veterinary drug, it is known as carbaril (INN).

Production
Carbaryl is often inexpensively produced by direct reaction of methyl isocyanate with 1-naphthol.
C10H7OH  +  CH3NCO  →   C10H7OC(O)NHCH3

Alternatively, 1-naphthol can be treated with excess phosgene to produce 1-naphthylchloroformate, which is then converted to carbaryl by reaction with methylamine.  The former process was carried out in Bhopal. In comparison, the latter synthesis uses exactly the same reagents, but in a different sequence. This procedure avoids the potential hazards of methyl isocyanate.

Biochemistry
Carbamate insecticides are slowly reversible inhibitors of the enzyme acetylcholinesterase. They resemble acetylcholine, but the carbamoylated enzyme undergoes the final hydrolysis step very slowly (minutes) compared with the acetylated enzyme generated by acetylcholine (microseconds). They interfere with the cholinergic nervous system and cause death because the effects of the neurotransmitter acetylcholine cannot be terminated by carbamoylated acetylcholinesterase.

Applications
The development of the carbamate insecticides has been called a major breakthrough in pesticides. The carbamates do not have the persistence of chlorinated pesticides.   Although toxic to insects, carbaryl is detoxified and eliminated rapidly in vertebrates. It is neither concentrated in fat nor secreted in milk, so is favored for food crops, at least in the US. It is the active ingredient in Carylderm shampoo used to combat head lice until infestation is eliminated.

Ecology
Carbaryl kills both targeted (e.g., malaria-carrying mosquitos) and beneficial insects (e.g., honeybees), as well as crustaceans. Because it is highly toxic to zooplankton, the algae they feed on experience blooms. Boone & Bridges 2003 find that larger algae eaters such as Bufo woodhousii benefit from this effect.

It is approved for more than 100 crops in the US. Carbaryl is illegal in the EU and Angola.

Safety
Carbaryl is a cholinesterase inhibitor and is toxic to humans. It is classified as a likely human carcinogen by the United States Environmental Protection Agency (EPA.)  The oral  is 250 to 850 mg/kg for rats and 100 to 650 mg/kg for mice.

Carbaryl can be produced using methyl isocyanate (MIC) as an intermediary. A leak of MIC used in the production of carbaryl caused the Bhopal disaster, the most lethal industrial accident in history.

References

External links
Carbaryl Technical Fact Sheet - National Pesticide Information Center
Carbaryl Pesticide Information Profile - Extension Toxicology Network
Cholinesterase Inhibition - Extension Toxicology Network
EPA info
EPA factsheet
IPCS (WHO) Health and Safety Guide
Environmental Health Criteria - WHO
Exclusive Chemistry Ltd - routes of Sevin synthesis
CDC - NIOSH Pocket Guide to Chemical Hazards

Acetylcholinesterase inhibitors
Carbamate insecticides
IARC Group 3 carcinogens
Endocrine disruptors
Naphthol esters
Veterinary drugs
Aromatic carbamates
1-Naphthyl compounds